Yıldırım Uran (6 October 1955 – 21 January 2019) was a Turkish football manager.

Early and personal life
Uran was born on 6 October 1955 in Ankara.

Career
Uran managed or coached at 22 teams. He obtained promotion to the Süper Lig with Siirtspor at the end of the 1999–2000 season. He was the manager for İzmirspor, Bucaspor, Kuşadasıspor, Siirtspor, Manisaspor, Petkimspor, Alanyaspor, Beylerbeyi, Uşakspor, Nazilli Belediyespor and Fethiyespor, always in the lower divisions of Turkish football.

After working as a manager in his own right, Uran spent much of his later career as an assistant to Hamza Hamzaoğlu at a number of clubs, including at Akhisar Belediyespor, Galatasaray, Bursaspor and Antalyaspor.

Later life and death
Uran died in Antalya on 21 January 2019, a week after suffering a heart attack.

References

1955 births
2019 deaths
Turkish football managers
Siirtspor managers
Akhisarspor non-playing staff
Galatasaray S.K. (football) non-playing staff
Bursaspor non-playing staff
Antalyaspor non-playing staff
İzmirspor managers
Bucaspor managers
Manisaspor managers
Alanyaspor managers
Beylerbeyi S.K. managers
Uşakspor managers
Nazilli Belediyespor managers
Fethiyespor managers
Malatyaspor non-playing staff
Eyüpspor non-playing staff
Denizlispor non-playing staff
Ankaraspor non-playing staff